Star Booty an EP mini-album by the American post-hardcore band Bitch Magnet. The record documents the band's early line-up, and was one of the first records produced by Steve Albini after he ended his group Big Black.

Release
Star Booty was first released independently in 1988. It was paired with the band's debut full-length album and re-issued by Communion the following year. In 2011 Star Booty was remastered by Alan Douches and released in a box-set with the rest of the band's catalog.

Track listing
All songs written by Bitch Magnet

Personnel

Bitch Magnet
Orestes Delatorre – drums
Jon Fine – guitar
Sooyoung Park – bass guitar, vocals

Additional musicians and production
Mark Bousek and Pete Smith – recording
Steve Albini – production
Günter Pauler – mastering

References

External links 
 

1988 EPs
Bitch Magnet albums
Albums produced by Steve Albini